Justice Tracy may refer to:

Benjamin F. Tracy, chief judge of the New York Court of Appeals
Philemon Tracy, associate justice of the Supreme Court of Georgia